Pernice may refer to:

 Pernice (surname), Italian surname
 Pernice Brothers, American indie rock band
 Pernice, Muta, Slovenia